Aglaomorpha is a genus of ferns in the subfamily Drynarioideae of the family Polypodiaceae.  The Pteridophyte Phylogeny Group classification of 2016 (PPG I) uses this genus name, while other sources use Drynaria to include Aglaomorpha. Species are commonly known as basket ferns. As circumscribed in PPG I, the genus contains around 50 species.

Basket ferns are epiphytic or epipetric and are native to tropical Africa, South Asia, East Asia, Southeast Asia, Australia, and Oceania. Some species are economically important as medicinal plants.

Description

Basket ferns are characterized by the presence of two types of fronds, fertile foliage fronds and sterile nest fronds. They are deeply lobed or pinnate, winged, and bear sori (structures producing and containing spores) on the bottom surfaces.

The nest fronds are smaller rounded leaves basal to the foliage fronds. They do not bear sori and are persistent, not being shed after turning brown and dying. They form a characteristic 'basket' that collect litter and organic debris, hence the common name. The collected debris decompose into humus, providing the plants with nutrients it would otherwise not have received from being suspended above the ground.

Both frond types grow from rhizomes typically anchored to a tree or a rock. The rhizomes of basket ferns are creeping and densely covered in brown scales.

Habitat and distribution
Basket ferns are epiphytic (growing on trees) or epipetric (growing on rocks). They can also sometimes be found in man-made structures like brick walls. They are found in wet tropical environments, usually in rainforests. Their native range extends from equatorial Africa to tropical South and East Asia, Southeast Asia, Australia, and Oceania.

Life cycle

Like other spore-bearing plants, Aglaomorpha exhibits metagenesis or the alternation of generations. One generation being the diploid multicellular sporophyte (the phase where the plant is most familiar), and the other being the haploid multicellular gametophyte (the phase where the plant is known as a prothallus). Gametophytes develop from spores released by mature sporophytes; while sporophytes, in turn, develop from the fusion of gametes produced by mature prothalli.

The synonym Drynaria lends its name to a certain type of prothallial germination, the 'Drynaria type', observed in several other ferns. In this type, the spores germinate into a germ filament composed of barrel-shaped chlorophyllous cells with one or more rhizoids at the base cell. The tipmost cell divides repeatedly by cross-walls, forming a broad spatulate (spoon-shaped) prothallial plate. One of the cells at the top margin of the prothallus then divides obliquely when it has 5, 10, or more cells across its width. This results in an obconical meristematic cell. Division by this type of cell is parallel to each other and perpendicular to the rest of the cells, forming rows. This eventually results in the formation of a notch at the anterior edge of the prothallus, giving it a roughly heart-shaped appearance (cordate).

The cordate prothallus are usually smaller with thinner midribs than that of other members of Polypodiaceae. They are also usually more sparsely haired, with some prothalli rarely having multicellular hair. They mature after six to nine months, and finish their life cycle at around a year. The gametophytes produce male (antheridium), and female (archegonium) gametes. The gametes fuse, forming the diploid sporophyte, the 'fern' part of the life cycle.

Aglaomorpha also naturally exhibits apospory, the production of a gametophyte not from spores, but directly from the vegetative cells of the sporophytes. Their leaves can develop prothalli under dim light and sporophytic buds in strong light.

Ecology

Aglaomorpha, like some other genera of ferns (including Polybotrya and Polypodium), possess specialized nectar-secreting structures (nectaries) on the bases of the frond lobes or the underside of the fronds. The produced nectar is rich in sugars and amino acids.

Their function may be to attract ants (or other organisms) for protection or for spore dispersal. They may also be simply excretory organs (hydathodes), used for exuding surplus metabolic products. The ant species Iridomyrmex cordatus is commonly associated with A. quercifolia, in addition to other epiphytic plants.

In Australia, Aglaomorpha rigidula serve as shelter for amethystine pythons (Morelia amethistina) and scrub pythons (Morelia kinghorni). Snakes seek shelter in A. rigidula more frequently during the colder seasons.

In the 19th century, Indigenous Australians were documented by the Norwegian explorer Carl Sofus Lumholtz to have hunted pythons regularly during the winter months by climbing up to individuals of A. rigidula.
The large rhizome mass of Aglaomorpha can also serve as growing substrates for other plants like the ribbon fern (Ophioglossum pendulum). Due to their ability to preserve moisture and persistence even after death, the nest leaves of Aglaomorpha are also fertile hosts to a large number of water-borne fungi.

Classification
Basket ferns are classified under the subfamily Drynarioideae of the family Polypodiaceae. Species belonging to Aglaomorpha were once classified under the genus Polypodium (rockcap ferns), under the subgenus Aglaomorpha.

Species
The following is the list of accepted species according to the Checklist of Ferns and Lycophytes of the World :
Aglaomorpha baronii (Diels) Hovenkamp & S. Linds.
Aglaomorpha bonii (Christ) Hovenkamp & S. Linds.
Aglaomorpha brooksii Copel.
Aglaomorpha cornucopia (Copel.) M. C. Roos
Aglaomorpha coronans (Wall. ex Mett.) Copel.
Aglaomorpha delavayi (Christ) Hovenkamp & S. Linds.
Aglaomorpha descensa (Copel.) Hovenkamp & S. Linds.
Aglaomorpha drynarioides (Hook.) M. C. Roos
Aglaomorpha × dumicola  (Bostock) comb. ined.
Aglaomorpha fortunei (Kunze ex Mett.) Hovenkamp & S. Linds.
Aglaomorpha heraclea (Kunze) Copel.
Aglaomorpha hieronymi (Brause) Copel.
Aglaomorpha involuta (Alderw.) Hovenkamp & S. Linds.
Aglaomorpha latipinna (C. Chr.) M. C. Roos
Aglaomorpha laurentii (Christ ex De Wild. & Durand) Hovenkamp & S. Linds.
Aglaomorpha meeboldii (Rosenst.) comb. ined.
Aglaomorpha meyeniana Schott
Aglaomorpha mollis (Bedd.) Hovenkamp & S. Linds.
Aglaomorpha nectarifera (Becc. ex Baker) M. C. Roos
Aglaomorpha novoguineensis (Brause) C. Chr.
Aglaomorpha parishii (Bedd.) Hovenkamp & S. Linds.
Aglaomorpha parkinsonii (Baker) Parris & M. C. Roos
Aglaomorpha pilosa (J. Sm. ex Kunze) Copel.
Aglaomorpha pleuridioides (Mett.) Hovenkamp & S. Linds.
Aglaomorpha propinqua (Wall. ex Mett.) Hovenkamp & S. Linds.
Aglaomorpha quercifolia (L.) Hovenkamp & S. Linds.
Aglaomorpha rigidula (Sw.) Hovenkamp & S. Linds.
Aglaomorpha sagitta (Christ) Hovenkamp & S. Linds.
Aglaomorpha sparsisora (Desv.) Hovenkamp & S. Linds.
Aglaomorpha speciosa (Blume) M. C. Roos
Aglaomorpha splendens (J. Sm.) Copel.
Aglaomorpha tricuspis (Hook.) Hovenkamp & S. Linds.
Aglaomorpha volkensii (Hieron.) Hovenkamp & S. Linds.
Aglaomorpha willdenowii (Bory) Hovenkamp & S. Linds.

Traditional medicine
Extracts from the rhizomes of some Aglaomorpha species are used extensively in traditional medicine. In China, Taiwan, Vietnam, Thailand, and Laos, the rhizomes of gu-sui-bu, Aglaomorpha fortunei (more frequently cited by Asian authors by its illegitimate synonym Drynaria fortunei), are commonly used to treat bone injuries. Its common name literally means "mender of shattered bones" in Chinese. Another species, the oak-leaf fern (Aglaomorpha quercifolia) is used similarly in South Asia and Maritime Southeast Asia.

Conservation

Species of Aglaomorpha commonly used in traditional medicine like A. roosii and A. quercifolia are in danger of being overexploited. None of the species are currently cultivated for the alternative medicine industry.

Aglaomorpha are also considered endangered in some areas (like in New South Wales, Australia), due to threats of habitat loss and low population numbers.

Evolution and fossil record
Fossil species have not been transferred to Aglaomorpha in PPG I, and are still recorded in the genus Drynaria. In 2010, twelve well-preserved fossil specimens were described from the Sanying Formation of the Yangjie coal mine of China. Named Drynaria callispora, it comes from the Piacenzian age of the Pliocene epoch (about 3.6 to 2.5 million years ago).

The fossil record of drynarioids is not very well documented due to the typically poor preservation of fossils recovered. Previous fossil species assigned to Drynaria include Drynaria astrostigma, D. dura, and D. tumulosa from the Cenomanian of the Czech Republic; and D. durum, all assigned tentatively to the genus in 1899. The arrangement and type of their sori, however, indicate that they are members of the family Matoniaceae instead.

Outside the genus, Protodrynaria takhtajani from the Eocene-Oligocene boundary of Kursk Oblast, Russia shows some affinities to Drynaria but only distantly. The only other reasonably convincing fossil remains of drynarioids aside from D. callispora was a specimen named Polypodium quercifolia recovered in 1985 from the Late Miocene (23.03 to 5.332 million years ago) of Palembang, Indonesia. These were later transferred to the living species Aglaomorpha heraclea. It remains, as of 2011, the oldest known drynarioid.

See also
Platycerium – staghorn or elkhorn ferns
Asplenium – spleenworts, bird's-nest ferns, and walking ferns
Polypodium – rockcap ferns

References

Aglaomorpha
Epiphytes
Medicinal plants
Fern genera